Maria Ana de Sousa Leal da Costa (Évora, Portugal, November, 1964), is a Portuguese sculptor.

Life
She is the daughter of an artist mother, and an architect father, she studied in the Superior School of Fine Arts of Lisbon and exhibits her work since 1994.
 
Has a studio in Marvão, in Quinta do Barrieiro, Alentejo, Portugal, where she lives and works since 1999 and where she is developing her project, Alentejo sculpture park.
 
The books open doors for her to fly to unknown stops, where she finds much of her inspiration, showing how they are an open window to the world. Traveling companion of Camões, Fernão Mendes Pinto, Fernando Pessoa, Sophia de Mello Breyner, Gonçalo M. Tavares, among other writers, she carves her digressions on the iron, marble and bronze, inviting the public to join her in her flights, to transcend, discover and penetrate into the core, in order to contemplate and transmit, demystify and to make us the pedagogy of a fragile planet but always open to all of us.
 
She struggles with hard materials, as if it were paper, with its natural expressions, the oxides, the textures, the colours or the fractures, in a permanent asceticism to transmit the beautiful, the unimaginable that thrill us, moves us and transport us to a path full of endless discoveries. It takes us to an enchantment to hear the resonance of a world unknown to us and where we want to penetrate into an infinite space of its dreams, into free imagination.
 
Her works are part of numerous public and private collections, in Portugal, Belgium, Spain, China, United States, Lithuania, Italy.

"The stone flies, floats, runs, speaks... just like the words!", (Maria Leal da Costa).

Biography 

Maria Leal da Costa was born in Évora, in 1964. She took the Interiors course at António Arroio School and between 1982 and 1986 attended the Sculpture course at Superior School of Fine Arts of Lisbon. She exhibits her work since 1994. She has a studio in Quinta do Barrieiro, Marvão, Portugal, where she lives and works since 1999.

Awards and Public Recognition

2015 
 Publication of the presentation of the sculpture “D’Amor”, in “Public Sculpture Guide of the City of Évora”, by the “Pró-Evora” Group
 Nominated for the award – LUX Plastic Arts 2014

2014 
 First prize of the Annual Saloon of the National Society of Fine Arts (SNBA) for the “Correntes de água (Watercourses)” work

2013 
 “Career Recognition/Plastic Arts” Prize, “Mais Alentejo” Gala

2011 
 Publication of the book “VOAR, poems and pictures resting on the sculptures of Maria Leal da Costa”

2008 
 She was awarded the “Mais Artes” prize at “Mais Alentejo” Gala

2007 
 Portugal’s representative at Stone Sculpture Symposium Vilnoja 2007, Lithuania, with the organization acquiring the work “O Poder do Silêncio (The Power of Silence)”

2006 
 “Abanico”, selected sculpture for the VIII “Certame de Artes Plásticas Sala el Brocense da Diputación de Cáceres”, Spain

2004 
 Spain, 1st place in the XI Iberian Award of Sculpture, City of Punta Umbría
 Spain, Vigo, honorable mention, Conxemar II Plastic Arts Competition
 Spain, selected for the International Competition of Sculpture in the Culture House in Villafranca de los Barros
 Spain, Salinas, selected for the III Bienal Internacional de Arte de la Mar

2003 
 1st  place in the public competition for the conception and execution of the monument to the Alter-Real Horse in Alter do Chão, Portugal
 Spain, selected for the X Iberian Award of Sculpture, City of Punta Umbría, Spain

2002 
 Participation in the symposium and workshop held by the Municipality of Vila Viçosa, Portugal

Individual Exhibitions

2015 
 “Leituras líticas (Lithic Readings)”, Belgium, Brussels, Brasil House
 “Pontos de Partida (Starting Points)” Portugal, Marvão Castle and Village

2014 
 Land Art Exhibition: “A vida tranquila, o verde da serra, o brilho do luar (The quiet life, the green of the mountain, the moonlight shining”, Portugal, Portalegre, Tarro Garden
 “A essência das coisas - esculturas habitáveis (The essence of things – habitable sculptures)”, Portugal, Portalegre Castle
 “Pontos de Partida (Starting Points)” Portugal, Marvão Castle and Village
 Certame Art Shopping, Caroussel du Louvre, Paris

2013 
 “Debaixo destas asas me aconchego (Cozy under these wings)”, China, Macau, Albergue Gallery SCM
 Land art exhibition: “A vida tranquila, o verde da serra, o brilho do luar (The quiet life, the green of the mountain, the moonlight shining)”, Portalegre, Tarro Garden

2012 
 “Voar (To fly)”, Évora, Municipal Museum
 “Un dialogo famigliare”, Italy, Roma, Instituto Portoghese di Sant´Antonio
 “Flor da realeza (Royal flower)”, Odivelas, Municipal Gallery
 “A beleza no silêncio de um olhar (The beauty in the silence of a look)”, Oleiros, Municipal Gallery

2011 
 “Instalação Voar (To Fly Installation)”, Évora, Municipal Museum
 “As quatro partes das esferas (The four parts of the spheres)” Lisbon, São Mamede Gallery
 “O contorno elementar (Elementary outline)”, Redondo, São Paulo da Serra d’Ossa Convent
 “Ikebana”, Barcelos, Municipal Gallery

2010 
 “Voar (To Fly)”, Latvia, Riga, Ventspils and Jurmala cities
 “Ritmanálise”, Porto, City Council
 “Velas são asas que apontam para o céu (Candles are wings that point to the sky)”, Vila Franca de Xira, Municipal Gallery

2009 
 She integrated the “Vilnius European Capital of Culture” in Lithuania, invited by Meno Nisa Gallery, with the exhibition “To Fly”, in the cities of Vilnius, Kaunas and Klaipeda

2008 
 “Fernão Mendes Pinto”, Matosinhos
 “Pedro e Inês”, Alter do Chão Castle
 Tribute to the painter Charrua, Lisbon, Portalegre tapestries Gallery
 Lisbon, Assembly of the Portuguese Republic

2007 
 “Enlaces (Links)”, Spain, Sevilha e Belgium, Brussels, integrated in the Portuguese Presidency of the European Union, and supported by the Luso-Spanish Foundation

2006 
 “Primavera (Spring)”, Belgium, Brussels, Orfeu bookstore
 United States of America, California, Benicia, Gina Sequeira Gallery
 Porto, Galeria Belmonte20 Gallery
 “Vibrações (Vibrations)”, Óbidos
 Lisbon, ViniPortugal

2004 
 Lisbon, Portuguese Communities Center
 “Alcultur”, Portalegre, Sta. Clara Convent

2003 
 Spain, Chiclana, House of Culture
 Spain, Badajoz, Colegio dos Arquitectos
 Portalegre, Sta Clara Convent
 Portalegre, Tapestries Museum

2002 
 Alter do Chão, Gallery of Alter Real Stud Farm 
 Évora, Gallery of the Directorate General for Cultural Heritage

2001 
 “Chegar (To arrive)”, China, Macau, International Institute of Macau, 1st Meeting of the Macanese Communities
 Spain, Villar del Rey
 Lisbon, Sta. Marta Hospital Church
 Évora, Lóios Pousada

2000 to 1995 
 Monsaraz, Santiago Church; United States of America, Califórnia
 Ponte de Sor, Municipal Gallery
 Lisboa, Pomar dos Artistas
 Portalegre, Álamo Gallery

Collective exhibitions

2015 
 TAG bxl, Belgium, Brussels

2014 
 "5th Essence - International Exhibition of Contemporary Art", Batalha, D. João I Cloister of the Monastery of Batalha
 Santarém, 55 Gallery

2013 
 “Portas Abertas (Open Doors)”, Évora, Eugénio de Almeida Foundation
 Algarve, Private Gallery
 Castelo de Vide, Nossa Senhora da Esperança Foundation
 Porto, Solar de Sto. António Gallery
 Santarém, 55 Gallery

2012 
 England, London, Debut Contemporary Art Gallery
 Almansil, Cultural Center of São Lourenço
 Santarém, 55 Gallery

2011 
 “Arte Pintada a letras (Art Painted in Letters)”, Espinho, Municipal Museum

2009 
 “Escultura Livre (Free Sculpture)”, Amadora
 “D. Afonso Henriques – Celebration of the 900 years since his birth”, Porto, Vieira Portuense Gallery

2008 
 Évora, S. Vicente Church
 Famalicão, Camiliano Museum
 Lisbon, Hibiscus Gallery
 “Escultura Livre (Free Sculpture)”, Loures

2007 
 Caminha, “Arte na Leira” Meeting
 “Escultura Livre (Free Sculpture)”, Famalicão
 Lisbon and Porto, São Mamede Gallery

2006 
 Caminha, “Arte na Leira” Meeting
 Lisbon, São Mamede Gallery
 Marvão, Municipal Gallery

2005 
 Lisboa, Magia Imagem Gallery
 Porto, Foz Castle

2004 
 Lisbon, Palace of Independence

2003 
 Lisbon, Magia Imagem Gallery

2002 
 Azores, Ponta Delgada, F.T.E. Gallery
 Lisbon, Alma Lusa Gallery
 Vila Viçosa, Marble Museum

2000 a 1995 
 Lisbon, Palace of Independence
 Portalegre, São Francisco Convent

Public Works

2013 
 Public Tactile Sculptures: “Centro histórico de Penafiel (Historical center of Penafiel)”, located in front of the City Council of Penafiel
 Public Tactile Sculptures: “Marvão Village”, located at the entrance of the village

2011 
 “Francisco Caldeira Amieiro”, Portalegre
 “Dr. Carlos Vacas de Carvalho”, Portalegre

2009 
 D’Amor”, Évora, city’s roundabout

2007 
 “1º Conde de Ervideira”, Évora, Vendinha square

2006 
 “Paul Harris”, Lisbon, São João de Brito Church Garden
 “Jogo de Memórias”, Portalegre, City Council

2005 
 Public Tactile Sculpture: “Belém Tower”, Lisbon, garden in front of the Belém tower
 Alter do Chão, “Alter Real horse”

2004 
 “Chestnut tree”, Marvão, Portagem roundabout
 “Lusitano Horse”, Portalegre, Campo da Feira roundabout
 “Muse”, Castelo de Vide, 25 de Abril garden

2002 
 “Lusitano Horse”, Portalegre

Custom sculptures

2012 
 COTEC Award, Business Association for Innovation
 “Justice”, Iustitia award, Silva e Sousa & Associados Law Firm

2010 
 “Justice”, Iustitia award, Silva e Sousa & Associados Law Firm

2009 
 “Justice”, Iustitia award, Silva e Sousa & Associados Law Firm

2008 
 “Justice”, Iustitia award, Silva e Sousa & Associados Law Firm
 “Family”, sculpture for UNICEF

References

External links

 https://portocanal.sapo.pt/noticia/48530/
 https://diariodigital.sapo.pt/news.asp?id_news=753631
 http://www.cmjornal.xl.pt/cultura/detalhe/escultora-maria-leal-da-costa-expoe-na-galeria-sao-mamede.html
 https://web.archive.org/web/20150217204351/http://nofemininonegocios.com/maria-leal-da-costa-expoe-em-lisboa.phtml
 https://visao.sapo.pt/maria-leal-da-costa-expoe-em-bruxelas-esculturas-inspiradas-na-literatura-portuguesa=f806547
 http://www.igogo.pt/escultura-de-maria-leal-da-costa/
 http://www.livrariaorfeu.com/
 http://memoria-africa.ua.pt/Catalog.aspx?q=TI%20maria%20leal%20da%20costa
 http://www.portalalentejano.com/pontos-de-partida-exposicao-de-escultura-de-maria-leal-da-costa-e-concertos-em-marvao/
 http://www.saomamede.com/artista.php?id_artista=205
 https://web.archive.org/web/20150226174857/http://www.lusojornal.com/unebe.pdf
 http://www.noticiasaominuto.com/cultura/327546/maria-leal-da-costa-premiada-pela-sociedade-de-belas-artes

1964 births
Living people
People from Évora
20th-century Portuguese sculptors
21st-century Portuguese sculptors